Corse Hill  is a hill located between East Renfrewshire and South Lanarkshire of Scotland.

References

Marilyns of Scotland
Landforms of East Renfrewshire
Mountains and hills of South Lanarkshire